Jens Koeppen (born 27 September 1962 in Zeitz, East Germany) is a German politician of the Christian Democratic Union who has been a member of the Bundestag since 2005.

Early life and education 
Koeppen has lived in Schwedt since 1963.

Political career 
Koeppen became politically active in 1989, when he joined the East German political movement Neues Forum. In 1997, he joined the CDU.

Since 18 September 2005, Koeppen has been a member of the German Bundestag, representing Uckermark – Barnim I. Between 2005 and 2013, he served as a member of the Committee on the Environment, Nature Conservation and Nuclear Safety. In 2009, Koeppen joined Andreas Scheuer in initiating a cross-party group for the protection of antique cars.

Following the 2013 federal elections, Koeppen moved to the Committee on Economic Affairs and Energy. In addition, he served as chairman of the Committee on the Digital Agenda from 2014 until 2017. He also serves as a member of the parliament's Council of Elders, which – among other duties – determines daily legislative agenda items and assigns committee chairpersons based on party representation.

In addition to his committee assignments, Koeppen is a member of the German-Hungarian Parliamentary Friendship Group and the Berlin-Taipei Parliamentary Circle of Friends.

In the negotiations to form a coalition government under the leadership of Chancellor Angela Merkel following the 2017 federal elections, Koeppen was part of the working group on digital policy, led Helge Braun, Dorothee Bär and Lars Klingbeil. He is leading his party's campaign for the 2021 federal elections in Brandenburg.

Other activities
 Federal Network Agency for Electricity, Gas, Telecommunications, Post and Railway (BNetzA), Member of the Advisory Board
 Rotary International, Member

Political positions 
In June 2017, Koeppen voted against Germany's introduction of same-sex marriage. Ahead of the Christian Democrats’ leadership election in 2018, he publicly endorsed Friedrich Merz to succeed Angela Merkel as the party's chair.

References

External links 
 Official Website of Jens Koeppen
 Vita at CDUCSU.de

1962 births
Living people
People from Zeitz
People from Bezirk Halle
Members of the Bundestag for Brandenburg
Members of the Bundestag 2021–2025
Members of the Bundestag 2017–2021
Members of the Bundestag 2013–2017
Members of the Bundestag 2009–2013
Members of the Bundestag 2005–2009
Members of the Bundestag for the Christian Democratic Union of Germany